Barling is a city in Sebastian County, Arkansas, United States. It is part of the Fort Smith, Arkansas-Oklahoma Metropolitan Statistical Area. As of the 2020 Census the population was 4,782, ranking it eighth in the Greater Fort Smith Area.  Barling was incorporated in 1956.

Geography 
Barling is located at  (35.322728, -94.300663).  It was named after Aaron Barling, a soldier originally posted to Fort Gibson in Indian Territory who subsequently farmed in Arkansas.

Demographics

2020 census

As of the 2020 United States census, there were 4,782 people, 1,791 households, and 1,227 families residing in the city.

2000 census
As of the census of 2000, there were 4,176 people, 1,599 households, and 1,122 families residing in the city. The racial makeup of the city was 87.05% White, 1.39% Black or African American, 1.87% Native American, 5.10% Asian, 0.02% Pacific Islander, 2.04% from other races, and 2.54% from two or more races.  3.98% of the population were Hispanic or Latino of any race.

There were 1,599 households, out of which 35.2% had children under the age of 18 living with them, 53.3% were married couples living together, 12.6% had a female householder with no husband present, and 29.8% were non-families. 26.5% of all households were made up of individuals, and 10.3% had someone living alone who was 65 years of age or older.  The average household size was 2.54 and the average family size was 3.07.

In the city, the population was spread out, with 26.5% under the age of 18, 8.7% from 18 to 24, 30.3% from 25 to 44, 21.8% from 45 to 64, and 12.7% who were 65 years of age or older.  The median age was 36 years. For every 100 females, there were 86.9 males.  For every 100 females age 18 and over, there were 85.9 males.

The median income for a household in the city was $37,605, and the median income for a family was $41,421. Males had a median income of $28,218 versus $22,936 for females. The per capita income for the city was $16,485.  About 10.0% of families and 11.9% of the population were below the poverty line, including 15.8% of those under age 18 and 14.3% of those age 65 or over.

Education
The following school districts include portions of Barling:
 Fort Smith School District
 Greenwood School District
 Lavaca Public Schools - operates Lavaca High School

Notable person
 Hal Smith, Major League Baseball player

Climate

The climate in this area is characterized by hot, humid summers and generally mild to cool winters.  According to the Köppen Climate Classification system, Barling has a humid subtropical climate, abbreviated "Cfa" on climate maps.

References

External links 
 Encyclopedia of Arkansas History & Culture entry: Barling (Sebastian County)

Cities in Arkansas
Cities in Sebastian County, Arkansas
Fort Smith metropolitan area
Populated places established in 1956
Arkansas populated places on the Arkansas River